The following is a list of governors of the State of Oklahoma and Oklahoma Territory.

Governors of Oklahoma Territory
Oklahoma Territory was formally organized on May 2, 1890.

As secretaries of Oklahoma Territory in 1891 and 1901 respectively, Robert Martin and William C. Grimes both served as acting governor whenever the presidentially appointed governorship was vacant.

Governors of the State of Oklahoma
Oklahoma Territory and Indian Territory joined the Union as the State of Oklahoma on November 16, 1907.

See also
Governor of Oklahoma

References

Oklahoma

Governors